The Roman Catholic Diocese of Karaganda is a Latin diocese of the Catholic Church, suffragan in the ecclesiastical province of the Metropolitan of Mary Most Holy in Astana, yet remains subject to the missionary Congregation for the Evangelization of Peoples.

Its cathedral episcopal see is the Marian Cathedral of Our Lady of Fatima, in the city of Karaganda in Kazakhstan. The city also had the former Cathedral of St. Joseph.

History 
Established on 1991.04.13 as Apostolic Administration of Kazakhstan, on vast territory (most of ex-Soviet Turkestan) split off from the Diocese of Vladivostok.

Lost territories repeatedly :
 on 1997.09.29 to establish Mission sui juris of Uzbekistan, Mission sui juris of Tajikistan and Mission sui juris of Turkmenistan
 on 1997.12.22 to establish Mission sui juris of Kyrgyzstan.

Promoted on 1999.07.07 as Diocese of Karaganda, losing territory to establish Apostolic Administration of Astana, Apostolic Administration of Almaty and Apostolic Administration of Atyrau.

Statistics 
As per 2014, it pastorally served 8,340 Catholics (0.2% of 3,640,000 total) on 711,208 km² in 19 parishes and 2 missions with 19 priests (15 diocesan, 4 religious) and 38 lay religious (4 brothers, 34 sisters).

Episcopal ordinaries
(all Roman Rite)

Apostolic Administrator of Kazakhstan 
 Jan Pawel Lenga, M.I.C. (1991.04.13 – 1999.07.07 see below), Ukrainian; Titular Bishop of Arba (1991.04.13 – 1999.07.07)

Suffragan Bishops of Karaganda
 Jan Pawel Lenga, M.I.C. (see above 1999.07.07 – 2003.05.17), personally promoted Archbishop-Bishop of Karaganda (2003.05.17 – emeritate 2011.02.05)
 Janusz Wiesław Kaleta (2011.02.05 – emeritate 2014.07.15), Polish; previously Titular Bishop of Phelbes (2006.09.15 – 2011.02.05) as Apostolic Administrator of Atyrau (Kazakhstan) (1999.07.07 – 2011.02.05) and later Apostolic Administrator ad nutum Sanctae Sedis of above Atyrau (2011.02.05 – 2012.12.07); lay state since 2016.05.30 
 Adelio Dell’Oro (2015.01.31 – ... ), Italian; previously Titular Bishop of Castulo (2012.12.07 – 2015.01.31) as Apostolic Administrator of Atyrau (2012.12.07 – 2015.05.16)

Auxiliary Bishops
 Athanasius Schneider, O.R.C., titular bishop of Celerina (8 April 2006 – 11 February 2011)
 Yevgeniy Zinkovskiy, titular bishop of Maiuca (since 29 June 2021)

See also 
 List of Catholic dioceses in Central Asia

Notes

Sources and external links 
 GCatholic, with Google map and satellite photo - data for all sections

Catholic Diocese of Karaganda
Roman Catholic dioceses in Kazakhstan